This article lists Japan Airlines incidents and accidents. (Bold dates - fatal accidents)

1950s 
 On 9 April 1952, Mokusei, Flight 301, a Martin 2-0-2 (N90943) leased from Northwest Orient Airlines, struck Mount Mihara while operating the first leg of a Tokyo-Osaka-Fukuoka service. The crash killed all 37 occupants on board the aircraft, including 4 crew members and 33 passengers. Because the aircraft did not have a CVR nor an FDR, the cause was never determined.
The aircraft force-landed in a rice field; all 57 on board were able to escape before the aircraft burned out. The cause was a malfunctioning cross-feed fuel valve.

1960s 
 On 25 April 1961, Hakone, a Japan Air Lines Douglas DC-8-32 from San Francisco to Tokyo, touched down and ran off the end of the  wet runway at Tokyo International Airport. The aircraft was shipped back and repaired by Douglas Aircraft Company at Long Beach, CA, United States, and returned to service as a Series 53 with a new registration (JA8008) in early 1963 and was renamed Matsushima.
 On 10 April 1962, Haruna, a Japan Air Lines Douglas C-54 from Fukuoka to Tokyo, made a wheels-up landing at Osaka. There were no casualties, however, the aircraft was damaged beyond repair and was written off.
The aircraft slid and caught fire.
 On 25 December 1965, Kamakura, Japan Air Lines Flight 813 operated by a Douglas DC-8 took off from San Francisco International Airport at 13:08 and suffered an uncontained engine failure on number one engine while climbing through . A fire erupted in the area of the number one engine, but was quickly extinguished. The aircraft made a safe emergency landing at Oakland International Airport, CA. The probable cause was "a disintegrating engine failure and in-flight fire caused by the failure of maintenance personnel to properly secure the low pressure compressor section torque ring during engine overhaul".
 On 26 August 1966, Ginza, a Japan Air Lines Convair 880 (leased from Japan Domestic Airlines) yawed left for unknown reasons after the nose lifted up during a training flight at Haneda Airport. Some  into takeoff, the number one engine struck the runway. The aircraft left the runway and the nose pitched down again. All four engines separated as well as the nose and left landing gear; the aircraft caught fire and burned out. All five crew died. 
 On 5 October 1967, a Japan Air Lines Beechcraft H18 (JA5137) crashed in a field at Murayama following engine failure while completing a training flight out of Yamagata Airport; all four crew survived.
 On 22 November 1968, Shiga, Japan Air Lines Flight 2 operated by a Douglas DC-8 accidentally landed in San Francisco Bay approx.  short of San Francisco International Airport. The aircraft was recovered after being in the water for 55 hours. There were no injuries to the crew or to any passengers. The probable cause was "the improper application of the prescribed procedures to execute an automatic-coupled ILS approach. This deviation from the prescribed procedures was, in part, due to a lack of familiarization and infrequent operation of the installed flight director and autopilot system". The aircraft was repaired by United Airlines at San Francisco International Airport and returned to JAL in March 1969. Pilot Kohhei Asoh said that he mistakenly believed that he was landing on the runway when in fact the plane hit the water several hundred yards away.
 On 24 June 1969, Kikyo, Japan Air Lines Flight 90 operated by a Convair 880 was taking off from runway 32R at Moses Lake Grant County International Airport. The power was reduced on the number four engine during take-off, however, the aircraft continued to yaw to the right until the number four engine struck and slid off the runway. It burst into flames, killing three of the five crew members on board. The probable cause was a "delayed corrective action during a simulated critical-engine-out takeoff maneuver resulting in an excessive sideslip from which full recovery could not be effected".

1970s

1970-1974 
In 1970, a teenage boy, Keith Sapsford, climbed into the cargo area of a Sydney to Tokyo flight. As the plane was taking off, he fell to his death. Unknowingly, a photographer had photographed the event. 
 On 31 March 1970, Yodo, Japan Air Lines Flight 351 operated by a Boeing 727 was hijacked by the Japanese Red Army (JRA) while en route from Tokyo to Fukuoka. The nine hijackers released all 122 passengers and seven crew members at Fukuoka Airport and Seoul's Gimpo International Airport, before proceeding to Pyongyang Sunan International Airport, where they surrendered themselves to the North Korean authority.
The crash killed 10 out of 11 crew members, 72 out of 76 passengers on board and 3 people on the ground died, including a famous Brazilian actress Leila Diniz at age 27. With 16 of the dead were Americans. Japanese investigators claimed a false glide path signal was responsible for the descent into terrain, while Indian investigators claimed it was caused by the JAL crew's disregard of laid down procedures and the abandonment of all instrument indications without properly ensuring sighting of the runway.
 On 24 September 1972, Haruna, Japan Air Lines Flight 472 operated by a Douglas DC-8 en route to Bombay landed at Juhu Airport runway 08, instead of Bombay Airport runway 09. The aircraft overran the runway through a ditch. There were no injuries reported, but the aircraft was written off.
 On 6 November 1972, a Japan Air Lines Boeing 727 was hijacked at Tokyo International Airport, the hijacker demanded money and to be taken to Cuba. The aircraft was stormed and the hijacker was arrested.
The aircraft lost height, hit the ground and burst into flames. Nine of the 14 crew members and 52 of the 62 passengers died in the accident. The probable cause was "the supercritical angle of attack was caused by either an inadvertent spoiler-extension in flight, or a loss of control following a number one or two engine failure (due to icing)".
 On 20 July 1973, Japan Air Lines Flight 404 operated by a Boeing 747-200B was hijacked by 4 men and a woman, shortly after leaving Amsterdam. An accidental explosion of the explosive device the woman hijacker was carrying occurred and she was killed. The aircraft was destined for Anchorage but was landed at Dubai and later took off for Damascus and Benghazi. Eventually, all the passengers and crew members were released and the aircraft was blown up on 23 July.
 On 12 March 1974, a Japan Air Lines Boeing 747 was hijacked at Naha Airport. The hijacker demanded money, but the aircraft was stormed and the hijacker was arrested.

1975-1979 
 In February 1975, a Japan Air Lines flight from Tokyo to Paris, making fuel stops in Anchorage and Copenhagen, had 196 passengers and one stewardess, out of 343 on board, fell ill with food poisoning, 143 of whom were seriously ill enough to need hospitalising when the plane reached Copenhagen, 30 of those critically ill. The source of the food poisoning was ham contaminated with Staphylococci from the infected cuts on the fingers of a cook in Anchorage. The ham was used in omelettes which were stored at a high temperature on the plane instead of being chilled, allowing time for the bacteria to multiply and produce an exotoxin that is not destroyed by cooking. The head of Japan Airlines catering service in Anchorage committed suicide shortly afterwards and was the only fatality of the incident. It was only luck that the pilots did not eat the omelettes (their body clocks were not in the right time zone for breakfast) and become incapacitated, leading some airlines to forbid pilots eating certain foods on the passenger menu.
 On 9 April 1975, Japan Air Lines Flight 514 operated by a Boeing 747SR was hijacked at Tokyo International Airport. The hijacker demanded money, the aircraft was subsequently stormed and the hijacker was arrested.
 On 16 December 1975, Japan Air Lines Flight 422 operated by a Boeing 747-200B slid off the north side of the east–west taxiway at Anchorage International Airport during taxi for a takeoff on runway 06R. The aircraft weathercocked about 70 degrees to the left and slid backward down a snow-covered embankment with an average slope of -13 degrees.
 On 5 January 1976, Japan Air Lines Flight 768 operated by a Douglas DC-8 was hijacked at Manila Airport. There were two hijackers and they surrendered.
 On 13 January 1977, Japan Air Lines Cargo Flight 1045, a Douglas DC-8 freighter stalled after lift off from Anchorage International Airport and crashed  past the runway. The aircraft was on a non-scheduled operation and all five occupants on board, including three crew members and two passengers, were killed. The aircraft began takeoff at the wrong position on the runway and his decision was not questioned by his fellow crew members. The probable cause was "a stall that resulted from the pilot's control inputs aggravated by airframe icing while the pilot was under the influence of alcohol. Contributing to the cause of this accident was the failure of the other flightcrew members to prevent the captain from attempting the flight".
 On 27 September 1977, Japan Air Lines Flight 715 operated by a Douglas DC-8 from Hong Kong to Kuala Lumpur struck a  hill on approach during a thunderstorm,  short of the runway, while on a VOR approach to runway 15. The fatalities for the accident include 8 crew members and 26 passengers.
 On 28 September 1977, Japan Air Lines Flight 472 operated by a Douglas DC-8 was hijacked by the JRA. The aircraft was en route from Paris to Tokyo with 156 people on board, made a scheduled stop in Bombay. Shortly after taking off from Bombay, five armed JRA members hijacked the aircraft and ordered to be flown to Dacca, Bangladesh. At Dacca (now Dhaka), the hijackers took the passengers and crew hostage, demanding $6 million and the release of nine imprisoned JRA members. A chartered JAL flight carried the money and six of the nine imprisoned JRA members to Dacca, where the exchange took place on October 2. The hijackers released 118 passengers and crew members, and all remaining hostages were freed later.
 On 2 June 1978, Japan Air Lines Flight 115 operated by a Boeing 747SR suffered a tailstrike while landing at Osaka; two passengers were seriously injured and another 23 suffered minor injuries. Although the aircraft was repaired in June and July 1978, it was lost in 1985 in the crash of Flight 123.
 On 23 November 1979, a Japan Air Lines McDonnell Douglas DC-10 was hijacked at Osaka International Airport. The hijacker demanded to be taken to the USSR, but was later arrested.

1980s 
 On 9 February 1982, Japan Air Lines Flight 350 operated by a McDonnell Douglas DC-8 was on scheduled passenger flight from Fukuoka to Tokyo. The aircraft crashed on approach into the shallow water of Tokyo Bay,  short of the runway 33R threshold. The nose and the right hand wing separated from the fuselage. Among the 166 passengers and 8 crew, 24 passengers were killed. The report shows that the captain had experienced some form of a mental aberration. He was prosecuted, but he was found not guilty by reason of insanity. 
 On 17 September 1982, Japan Air Lines Flight 792 operated by a McDonnell Douglas DC-8 took off from Shanghai at 13:57. Nine minutes later, the crew heard a noise coming from the lower middle part of the aircraft. This was immediately followed by a hydraulic low level warning; a hydraulic reservoir air low pressure warning; a complete loss of hydraulic system pressure; abnormal flap position indications; and a complete loss of air brake pressure. The flight crew decided to return to Shanghai for an emergency landing on runway 36. The aircraft overran the runway and came to a rest in a drainage ditch.
 On 12 August 1985, Japan Air Lines Flight 123 operated by a Boeing 747SR (the same aircraft aforementioned involved in a tailstrike incident in 1978) bound for Osaka, lost all its hydraulic flight control systems shortly after takeoff from Tokyo International Airport and, after attempting to limp back to Tokyo, crashed into Mount Takamagahara near Gunma Prefecture. It was the deadliest single-aircraft disaster in history (and the third deadliest air disaster in history, after the September 11 attacks and the Tenerife airport disaster); 520 out of 524 people on board died, including the famous singer Kyu Sakamoto.
On 17 November 1986, The crew of Japan Air Lines Cargo Flight 1628, operated by a Boeing 747-200F, while en route to Tokyo, claimed to have spotted two Unidentified Flying Objects (UFO) at the Reykjavik to Anchorage section of the flight. They both had two rectangular arrays of nozzles / thrusters. When the UFOs were closer to the aircraft, the crew felt the heat coming from the nozzles / thrusters.  They requested the air traffic controller in Anchorage, Alaska to send other close flights to witness the UFOs. However, a United Airlines flight came near the scene, but the crew did not report anything near Flight 1628. The unusual sight was for just under an hour and it ended near Denali.

1990s 
 On 2 October 1991, a Japan Airlines Boeing 747-200B was climbing through FL165 when the force from a hot liquid released from a burst pipe in the pressurization system, and blew a  hole in the fuselage beneath the port wing. The captain dumped fuel and returned safely to Tokyo.
 On 31 March 1993, Japan Air Lines Cargo Flight 46E, a Boeing 747-100 operated by Evergreen International Airlines, experienced severe turbulence at an altitude of about  after departure about 12:24 local time, resulted in dynamic multi-axis lateral loadings that exceeded the ultimate lateral load-carrying of the number two engine pylon. This caused the number two engine to separate from the aircraft; the number one engine was maintained at emergency/maximum power and the aircraft landed safely back at Anchorage International Airport at 12:45.
 On 8 June 1997, Etupirka, Japan Airlines Flight 706, operated by a McDonnell Douglas MD-11 from Hong Kong to Nagoya, descended  through approx.  over the Shima Peninsula for an approach to Nagoya. It then experienced abrupt and abnormal altitude changes, which injured five passengers and seven crew members. The captain was indicted for an alleged error in piloting the MD-11 aircraft, and then blamed for the death of a cabin crew member 20 months after the incident. The Nagoya District Court later acquitted the 54-year-old captain, Koichi Takamoto, on 31 July 2004.

2000s 
 On 31 January 2001, in the Japan Airlines mid-air incident, Japan Airlines Flight 907 operated by a Boeing 747-400D and Japan Airlines Flight 958 operated by a McDonnell Douglas DC-10 had a near miss incident near Yaizu, Shizuoka.
 On 12 November 2001, Japan Airlines Flight 047, operated by a Boeing 747-400 en route to Tokyo from JFK in New York City, produced the wake turbulence that was the initiating factor in the loss of American Airlines Flight 587; this was neither the fault of nor had any effect on the Japan Airlines flight.

2010s 
 On 28 October 2018, Japan Airlines pilot Katsutoshi Jitsukawa, 42, was arrested at Heathrow Airport for being under the influence after failing a breath test. He pled guilty to exceeding the alcohol limit on 1 November.

2020s 
 On December 4, 2020, Japan Airlines Flight 904, operated by a Boeing 777-200 from Okinawa to Tokyo Haneda suffered a fan blade failure in one of its two PW4084 engines. None of the 189 occupants on board were injured in the incident.

References